The Talamancan small-eared shrew (Cryptotis gracilis) is a species of mammal in the family Soricidae. It is found in Costa Rica and Panama.

References

Cryptotis
Mammals of Central America
Taxonomy articles created by Polbot
Mammals described in 1911
Talamancan montane forests